A list of films produced by the Bollywood film industry based in Mumbai in 1943:

Highest-grossing films
The ten highest-grossing films at the Indian box office in 1943:

A-D

F-L

M-N

O-R

S-Z

References

External links
 Bollywood films of 1943 at the Internet Movie Database

1943
Bollywood
Films, Bollywood